The 2008 Honda Grand Prix of St. Petersburg was the second round of the 2008 IndyCar Series season and took place on April 6, 2008 at the  temporary street and airport circuit on the streets of St. Petersburg, Florida. The race was a time-limited race due to rain, with the race falling some seventeen laps short of full race distance. The race was won by Graham Rahal on his IndyCar Series debut, having missed the first round at Homestead-Miami Speedway, due to a lack of spare parts for his #06 Newman/Haas/Lanigan Racing machine.

At 19 years, 93 days old, Rahal became the youngest driver ever to win an Indy-style race, as well as the youngest winner in IndyCar Series history breaking Marco Andretti's record of 19 years, 167 days from the 2006 IndyCar Series season. He also became the fourth driver to win an IndyCar Series race in his first start, joining Buzz Calkins, Juan Pablo Montoya and Scott Dixon.

Qualifying 
 All cars are split into two groups of thirteen, with the fastest six from each group going through to the "Top 12" session. In this session, the fastest six runners will progress to the "Firestone Fast Six". The fastest driver in this final session will claim pole, with the rest of the runners lining up in session order, regardless of qualifying times. (Fast Six from 1-6, Top 12 from 7-12 and Round 1 from 13-26) Drivers can use as many laps as they want in the timed sessions.

Round 1

Group 1

Group 2

Round 2 (Top 12)

Round 3 (Firestone Fast Six)

Grid 

 Before the race, Marty Roth had a problem with his car and did not start. Bruno Junqueira therefore moved up to 25th on the grid.

Race

Notes 
 The race began under caution, due to the rain that was lying on the street circuit. The race would finally go green on lap 10.
 Due to a two-hour time limit, the race was curtailed after 83 of the original 100 laps.

References 

Honda Grand Prix of St. Petersburg
Grand Prix of St. Petersburg
Honda Grand Prix
21st century in St. Petersburg, Florida
Honda Grand Prix of St. Petersburg